Geervliet is a town in the Dutch province of South Holland. It is a part of the municipality of Nissewaard, and lies about 6 km northwest of Spijkenisse on the Brielse Meer. It received city rights in 1381.

Geervliet was a separate municipality until 1980, when it became part of Bernisse.

Demographics
In 2001, the town of Geervliet had 1670 inhabitants. The built-up area of the town was 0.34 km², and contained 687 residences. The wider statistical district of Geervliet, which covers the entire "Polder Geervliet" has a population of around 2290. This includes the 290 inhabitants of the village Simonshaven.

Notable residents 
 Stars Over Foy, DJ and producer

See also
Schuddebeurs en Simonshaven

References

Populated places in South Holland
Former municipalities of South Holland
Nissewaard